The Museum of History & Industry (MOHAI) is a history museum in the South Lake Union neighborhood of Seattle, Washington, United States. It is the largest private heritage organization in Washington state, maintaining a collection of nearly four million artifacts, photographs, and archival materials primarily focusing on Seattle and the greater Puget Sound region. A portion of this collection (roughly 2% at any given time) is on display in the museum's galleries at the historic Naval Reserve Armory in Lake Union Park.

The museum's keynote exhibits include: Boeing's first commercial plane, the 1919 Boeing B-1; the Petticoat Flag, a U.S. flag sewn by women during the 1856 Battle of Seattle; and the Rainier Brewing Company's 12-foot tall neon "R" sign. In addition to both permanent and temporary exhibits, MOHAI administers ongoing youth and adult programming, and regularly hosts public events in partnership with other community organizations, particularly within the South Lake Union neighborhood. MOHAI is accredited by the American Alliance of Museums and is a Smithsonian affiliate museum.

History
In 1911, Morgan and Emily Carkeek hosted the first annual Founder's Day party at their home, which was an invitation-only event where guests dressed in historic costumes and brought artifacts and documents related to early Seattle. An outcome of these parties was the establishment of the Seattle Historical Society in 1914, the membership of which was limited to white settlers and their descendants.

The Seattle Historical Society lacked a building to house the museum. Several attempts to find a permanent location were abandoned because of challenging financial circumstances, especially during the Depression, and the fact that the original society members were aging and new members were not joining. The collection continued to grow, however. In 1945, Boeing offered $50,000 towards an aviation wing, and over the next five years, the Society procured a site in Montlake. During this time, the Society became a more public and civic-minded institution, opening up the Founder's Day event to community and service organizations. The new museum opened in 1952.

Over the last 50 years, management practices of the museum and collections, membership, and the relationship to its immediate surroundings, have been problematic. Changes in the 1980s included developing new exhibits and reaching out to underrepresented communities, which were a shock to older staff and board members. During the 1990s the museum gradually recovered from these internal challenges, as well as financial ones, and began expanding educational and community outreach programs.

The impending reconstruction of SR-520 forced MOHAI to move from the Montlake site. After exploring options to move near the Washington State Convention Center, MOHAI and the City of Seattle agreed to move MOHAI to the Naval Reserve Armory in what was soon to be Lake Union Park. At that time, the building was being managed by the Seattle Parks and Recreation Department and was in need of significant repairs to be usable as a public museum space. Through a $90 million capital campaign, MOHAI did a full historic restoration of the facility, uncovering both the original ceiling and floor and conducting massive safety, accessibility, and systems upgrades. The project also included centralizing MOHAI's library and collections departments in a warehouse in the Georgetown neighborhood. In June 2012 the museum closed its Montlake location. Six months later, on December 29, 2012, the museum held a public grand opening for its new home in South Lake Union.

Galleries

True Northwest: The Seattle Journey

MOHAI's core exhibit rings most of the building's second floor and provides a chronological history of Seattle and its environs. The exhibit winds through a series of 22 different sections that each focus on a distinct event or era in Seattle history ranging from pre-Pioneer settlements up to the modern day. MOHAI Creative Director Ann Farrington, who previously worked on Seattle's Experience Music Project and the National Holocaust Museum, has said that it is, "not a timeline, but a series of stories strung like pearls" in order to reveal how Seattle's past, present, and future are interconnected. Along with numerous artifacts and photographs, the exhibit incorporates a significant amount of interactive media that allow visitors to touch screens or play games that explore different parts of Seattle history and culture. The core exhibit also includes the Great Fire Theatre, a "Gilbert and Sullivan-style opera" that involves artifacts from the 1889 Great Seattle Fire singing the story of the event over a film of historic images,  and the Joshua Green Foundation Theater which  plays a 7-minute film about Seattle culture on two large screens.

Faye G. Allen Grand Atrium

The first floor of the museum is an expansive open room  named the Faye G. Allen Grand Atrium. Both the original floor and ceiling of the Naval Reserve Building are visible from the Grand Atrium. Hanging in the center of the space is the 1919 Boeing B-1, the first commercial plane built by Bill Boeing. The plane is displayed to illustrate a typical flight path onto Lake Union, where the plane took off and landed during its tenure.  On the south end of the Grand Atrium is a three story tall grid filled with Seattle cultural icons, including the neon Rainier "R" sign, a clam costume from Seattle seafood chain Ivar's, and a stuffed cougar donated by Eddie Bauer, founder of the namesake clothing store. The north end of the Grand Atrium features a 64-foot tall sculpture called Wawona by local artist John Grade. Wood and other materials for the sculpture were salvaged from the 1897 schooner Wawona, which was dismantled in 2009 due to a lack of funding for restoration.

Walker Special Exhibits Gallery
The Walker Gallery is MOHAI's main space for displaying temporary and traveling exhibits. It takes up the entire southern side of the museum's second floor. When the museum initially opened at Lake Union Park, the Walker Gallery showcased an exhibit about Seattle's relationship with film called Celluloid Seattle: A City at the Movies. In 2015, the Walker Gallery hosted American Spirits: The Rise & Fall of Prohibition travelling from the National Constitution Center.

Linda and Ted Johnson Family Community Gallery
Another temporary gallery that occupies the third floor space of the museum. Much smaller than the Walker Gallery, the space is designed "to promote community ownership and stewardship of MOHAI" by showcasing collaborative projects with community partners. The first exhibit in the gallery was a partnership with leading Seattle arts group Arts Corps, that worked with Seattle high school students to produce poetry and spoken word related to photos from MOHAI's historic photographic collection.

McCurdy Family Maritime Gallery
On the top floor of the museum is a small gallery dedicated to Seattle's maritime history. The space was originally designed as a replica of a ship's bridge in order to train naval recruits during World War II and features a set of south facing windows overlooking Lake Union.  One of the most popular artifacts in the gallery is a working World War II-era TANG periscope from a naval submarine which offers a 360-degree view of Lake Union and downtown Seattle. The gallery is curated by the Puget Sound Maritime Historical Society which has maintained a close partnership with MOHAI since the early 1950s.

Bezos Center for Innovation
The museum opened a major museum addition on October 11, 2013 called the Bezos Center for Innovation. The project is funded by a $10 million gift from Amazon.com founder and CEO Jeff Bezos. The project was designed by Seattle-based Olson Kundig Architects and occupies a portion of the museum's Grand Atrium.

Education programs
The K-12 programming at MOHAI is designed to complement the permanent exhibition, "True Northwest: The Seattle Journey". Programs are designed to support teachers through meeting state curriculum standards, and offering professional development opportunities; use primary sources to promote critical thinking; present multiple perspectives to explore diverse experiences and histories that make up Seattle's story; make history relevant with personal connections; and create links across academic disciplines.

Onsite programs for students are designed to complement the permanent exhibition. Students use primary sources to explore Seattle's stories, gather evidence to crack history mysteries, and explore facts and myths about Seattle's past.

Outreach resources include themed trunks that include artifacts, audio/visual resources, and adaptable activities that are aligned to state curriculum standards. Themes range from Native American People of Washington State, to the Settlers of Washington State, to the War Years. Themed packets of visual resources include photographs and slides, background histories and activities. Themes include Early Recreation in Seattle, Changing Scenes of Downtown Seattle, and Women in Washington History. Finally, a reader's theater script, drawn from primary sources relating to the Gold Rush, comes with stage directions.

MOHAI also organizes professional development opportunities for teachers, to strengthen their understanding of Seattle's history, object-based learning, and curriculum standards.

Collections

MOHAI has around 4 million objects in the collection, including roughly 100,000 three dimensional artifacts, over 3 million photographs, and around 200,000 archival holdings. Collections focus on Seattle's early settlement (ca. 1850) through the present day, and concentrate on the stories and achievements of Seattle and King County residents. The three dimensional collection encompasses a range of items such as textiles, fine art, decorative arts, household objects, maritime equipment, early computers, vehicles and more. The museum also has a growing collection of oral histories from long-time Puget Sound residents.

Photograph collection
The most heavily used portion of MOHAI's holdings is the collection of approximately 3.75 million historic photographs, which is the largest aggregation of historic documentary photography in the region. Like the rest of MOHAI's collections, the photos are primarily focused on Seattle and King County, but includes strong coverage of other parts of Washington State as well as Alaska. One of the most extensive sets of photos is the Seattle Post-Intelligencer Collection. Seattle's (now defunct) original newspaper donated an estimated 2 million photographs to MOHAI in three successive gifts from 1975 to 2012. The collection comprises both published and unpublished news photos taken throughout Western Washington from 1917 to 2009. Another major group of photos is the PEMCO Webster & Stevens Collection. Operating under the motto, "Anything. Anytime. Anywhere." Webster & Stevens was a major commercial photography studio that set up shop in Seattle in 1903. They had a range of important clients, most notably the Seattle Times, which used the studio for nearly all of its newspaper photographs for 23 years until it hired staff photographers. In 1983 PEMCO Insurance made a $50,000 gift to MOHAI, allowing it to purchase roughly 55,000 photos by Webster & Stevens, creating the PEMCO Webster & Stevens Collection. Other noteworthy MOHAI photograph collections include: The Milkie Studio Collection; The King County News Photo Collection; The Seattle Historical Society Collection; Alaska Bureau Photograph Albums; Anders Beer Wilse Photographs 1892-1913; Ferdinand Brady Photographic Postcards circa 1907-1920; Frederick and Nelson Records 1901-1991; H.W. McCurdy Collection on the Puget Sound Bridge & Dredging Co. 1900-1945; Lockheed Shipbuilding and Construction Company Photographs; Moran Brothers Company Collection 1893-1939; Josef Scaylea Collection; Cary Tolman Collection; Robert H. Miller Collection; Washington Dayshoot Collection.

Sophie Frye Bass Library

Most of MOHAI's archival holdings—including manuscripts, photographs, maps, books, motion pictures, and printed ephemera—are housed in the museum's library. The library is named after Sophie Frye Bass (1866–1947), granddaughter of pioneers Arthur and Mary Denny, and author of two books on early life in early Seattle including Pig Tail Days in Old Seattle (Pub. 1937). Bass was a prolific collector of historical books and manuscripts, and in 1914 donated her entire library to MOHAI's predecessor, the Seattle Historical Society. The library also houses the collections of the Puget Sound Maritime Historical Society and the Black Heritage Society of Washington State. The library, located in Seattle's Georgetown neighborhood, is open to the public by appointment.

See also
 History of Seattle
 Arts in Seattle

Notes

External links

 
 HistoryLink: The Free Online Dictionary of Washington State History
 "A Place Comfortable With Boeing, Anarchists and ‘Frasier’", Edward Rothstein, The New York Times, December 28, 2012

City museums in the United States
Museums in Seattle
History museums in Washington (state)
Museums established in 1952
Institutions accredited by the American Alliance of Museums
Industry museums in Washington (state)
South Lake Union, Seattle